HNLMS Amsterdam (D819) was a destroyer of the . The ship was in service with the Royal Netherlands Navy from 1957 to 1980. The destroyer was named after the Dutch city of Amsterdam and was the nineteenth ship with this name. In 1980 the ship was taken out of service and sold to Peru where it was  renamed Villar. The ship's radio call sign was "PABH".

Dutch service history
HNLMS Amsterdam was one of eight s and was built at the NDSM in Amsterdam. The keel laying took place on 26 March 1955 and the launching on 25 August 1956. The ship was put into service on 10 April 1958.

In the late 1950s the ship received a test installation that had earlier been on the Mercuur for testing the use of the British MK 20E torpedo.

The ship left on  8 October 1959 for Netherlands New Guinea visiting the ports of Gibraltar, Palermo, Beirut, Port Said, Colombo, Fremantle, Perth and Port Darwin along the way. The ship would arrive on 29 November in Biak. 10 April 1961 Amsterdam and HNLMS Piet Hein left for the Netherlands where they would arrive 20 months later.

On 12 May 1980 the vessel was decommissioned and sold to the Peruvian Navy.

Peruvian service history
The ship was put into service on 23 May 1980 where the ship was renamed Villar and decommissioned in 1991.

Notes

Friesland-class destroyers
1956 ships
Ships built in Amsterdam
Destroyers of the Cold War